Clémentine Delauney (born 11 February 1987) is a French singer with a soprano vocal range. She was the female backing vocalist for Austrian symphonic metal band Serenity, currently Visions of Atlantis and French opera metal band Melted Space. She was previously the vocalist of French philharmonic metal band Whyzdom from late 2010 to early 2012.

In 2017, Clémentine formed the band Exit Eden with three other female singers from the rock/metal scene: Amanda Somerville (Avantasia, Trillium, HDK), Marina La Torraca (who replaced Amanda in some shows of the festival season of Avantasia 2016 world tour) and newcomer Anna Brunner. The band was conceived with the plan "to show the world that almost every classic song can be transformed into a solid Metal-Rock song", a concept similar to Finland's Northern Kings. The tracklist of their debut album called Rhapsodies in Black features some pop hits such as Madonna's Frozen, Adele's Skyfall and Lady Gaga's Paparazzi. The release date was August 2017 via Napalm Records worldwide and via Starwatch in Germany, Switzerland and Austria.

Discography

Serenity 
Studio albums
War of Ages (2013)
Singles
Wings of Madness (2013)

Visions of Atlantis 
Studio albums
 The Deep & the Dark (2018)
 Wanderers (2019)
 Pirates (2022)

EPs
"Old Routes – New Waters" (2016)

Guest appearances 
Tales of the Sands (Myrath, 2009) vocals on "Under Siege"
XXX – Three Decades in Metal (Hansen & Friends, 2016) vocals on "Fire and Ice", "Left Behind" and "All or Nothing", "Save Us"
Leaves' Eyes – Black Butterfly (The Last Viking, 2020)

 Exit Eden 
Albums
 Rhapsodies in Black'' (2017) (Starwatch Entertainment/Napalm Records)

Singles
 "Unfaithful" (Rihanna cover) (2017) (Starwatch Entertainment/Napalm Records)
 "Impossible" (Shontelle cover) (2017) (Starwatch Entertainment/Napalm Records)
 "Incomplete" (Backstreet Boys cover) (2017) (Starwatch Entertainment/Napalm Records)
 "Paparazzi" (Lady Gaga cover) (2017) (Starwatch Entertainment/Napalm Records)
 "A Question of Time" (Depeche Mode cover) (2017) (Starwatch Entertainment/Napalm Records)

References

External links 

Clementine Delauney official site

1987 births
Living people
Musicians from Paris
Women heavy metal singers
French sopranos
French singer-songwriters
21st-century French women singers